Las Palmas Glacier is a glacier flowing west-northwest from Hurd Dome and terminating at Las Palmas Cove, South Bay, Livingston Island, Antarctica. The name was given by the Spanish Antarctic Expedition, about 1991, after the ship Las Palmas of the Spanish Antarctic campaigns since 1988.

See also
 List of glaciers in the Antarctic
 Glaciology

Maps
 Isla Livingston: Península Hurd. Mapa topográfico de escala 1:25000. Madrid: Servicio Geográfico del Ejército, 1991. (Map reproduced on p. 16 of the linked work)
 L.L. Ivanov et al. Antarctica: Livingston Island and Greenwich Island, South Shetland Islands. Scale 1:100000 topographic map. Sofia: Antarctic Place-names Commission of Bulgaria, 2005.
 L.L. Ivanov. Antarctica: Livingston Island and Greenwich, Robert, Snow and Smith Islands. Scale 1:120000 topographic map.  Troyan: Manfred Wörner Foundation, 2009.  
 Antarctic Digital Database (ADD). Scale 1:250000 topographic map of Antarctica. Scientific Committee on Antarctic Research (SCAR). Since 1993, regularly upgraded and updated.
 L.L. Ivanov. Antarctica: Livingston Island and Smith Island. Scale 1:100000 topographic map. Manfred Wörner Foundation, 2017.

References

External links
 SCAR Composite Antarctic Gazetteer.

Glaciers of Livingston Island
Spain and the Antarctic